Camponotus silvestrii is a species of carpenter ant in the genus Camponotus.

References

silvestrii
Insects described in 1906